London Design and Engineering UTC is a mixed University Technical College which opened in September 2016 at the University of East London campus in the Royal Docks area of the London Borough of Newham. It caters for students aged 14 to 19 years.

The UTC is sponsored by the University of East London, Thames Water, Costain Group, Skanska and the Diocese of Chelmsford Educational Trust.

References

External links

Secondary schools in the London Borough of Newham
University Technical Colleges
Educational institutions established in 2016
2016 establishments in England